TD Auto Finance is a financial-services provider. The company offers dealer finance plans, dealer services, and retail consumer finance plans. It is a subsidiary of Toronto-Dominion Bank.

As Chrysler Financial, the company supported financial products and services to both dealers and purchasers of Chrysler, Jeep and Dodge vehicles in the United States, Canada, Mexico, Puerto Rico and Venezuela. It was based in Farmington Hills, Michigan, with a final total of 3,600 employees, and a global contract of $75 billion as of 2007.
In January 2009, Chrysler Financial was the recipient of $1.5 billion from the Troubled Asset Relief Program (TARP).  The company said that it used the money to fund 85,000 loans to purchase Chrysler automobiles.  Chrysler Financial repaid the TARP loan in July 2009 by raising funds from an asset-backed securitization through the Term Asset-Backed Securities Loan Facility program.

In December 2010, Toronto-Dominion Bank announced it would acquire Chrysler Financial for $6.3 billion from private equity firm Cerberus Capital Management. The company was renamed TD Auto Finance in early June 2011.

TD has more than 83,000 employees worldwide, offering a range of financial products and services to almost 25 million customers.

See also
Economy of metropolitan Detroit

References

External links

Toronto-Dominion Bank
Chrysler
Financial services companies of the United States
Companies based in Oakland County, Michigan
Financial services companies established in 1964